Tun Mohamed Salleh bin Ismael (7 July 1917 – 31 January 1973) was the second Inspector-General of Police of Malaysia, and the first Asian and ethnic Malay to hold that post, taking office on 29 March 1966. His predecessor was Claude Fenner. His work resulted in the "Salleh System", as well as the National Police Cadets and the Police Volunteer Reserve. 

Before being promoted to Inspector-General, he was also Federal Police Secretary to the Commissioner of Police (from 31 August 1957), Deputy Commissioner of Police (1 April 1961 – 31 March 1962), Director of Police Affairs (1 April 1962 – 12 July 1962), Commissioner of Police, Federation of Malaya (13 July 1962 – 8 February 1966).

Honours
  : 
 Companion of the Order of the Defender of the Realm (JMN) (1958)
  :
 Commander of the Order of the Defender of the Realm (PMN) – Tan Sri (1963)
 Recipient of the Malaysian Commemorative Medal (Gold) (PPM) (1965)
 Grand Commander of the Order of Loyalty to the Crown of Malaysia (SSM) – Tun (1973)
 :
Recipient of the Meritorious Service Medal (PJK)
 Knight Grand Commander of the Order of the Perak State Crown (SPMP) – Dato' Seri (1970)
 :
 Knight Companion of the Order of the Crown of Pahang (DIMP) – Dato' (1970)

Commonwealth Honours
 :
 Recipient of the Queen's Police Medal (Q.P.M.) (1957)

Foreign honours
  :
  Commander of the National Order of Vietnam (1965)

References 

 
1917 births
1973 deaths
Malaysian people of Malay descent
Malaysian Muslims
People from Penang
Malaysian police officers
Malaysian police chiefs
Companions of the Order of the Defender of the Realm
Commanders of the Order of the Defender of the Realm
Grand Commanders of the Order of Loyalty to the Crown of Malaysia
Colonial recipients of the Queen's Police Medal